Beauty Queen Sister is the 13th studio album by Indigo Girls, released on October 4, 2011 on Vanguard Records.

Track listing
"Share the Moon" – 3:34
"John" – 4:22
"Beauty Queen Sister" – 3:11
"We Get to Feel It All" – 3:32
"War Rugs"  – 3:23
"Gone" – 3:02
"Mariner Moonlighting" – 3:36
"Birthday Song" – 4:19
"Feed and Water the Horses" – 4:30
"Making Promises" – 3:19
"Damo"  – 4:07
"Able to Sing" – 4:02
"Yoke" – 5:09

Personnel
Indigo Girls
Amy Ray – Vocals, songwriting, electric guitar (1–5, 7, 8, 13), acoustic guitar (6, 10, 12), electric mandolin (9), mandolin (11)
Emily Saliers – Vocals, songwriting, ukulele (1), acoustic guitar (2, 4, 6, 8–12), electric guitar (3), slide guitar (6), classical guitar (7)
Additional Musicians
Carol Isaacs – Wurlitzer (1, 4, 12), Hammond B3 (1, 2), vibes (1, 4, 5, 7–9, 13), piano (3, 6–9), accordion (10, 13)
Brady Blade – drums (1–4, 6, 9, 10, 12), loop (2)
Jim Brock – percussion (1–10, 12, 13), loop (2), drums (5, 7, 8, 13)
John Reynolds – drums (11)
Stuart Mathis – electric guitar (10)
John McLoughlin – acoustic guitar (11), mandolin (11)
Luke Bulla – violin (1, 2, 4–6, 8, 9, 13), mandolin (2, 5, 7, 9, 10, 12)
Allison Brown – banjola (2, 8, 9, 12), banjo (5–7)
Frank Howard Swart – bass (1–4, 6, 9, 10, 12) 
Clare Kenny – bass (11)
Viktor Krauss – upright bass (5, 7, 8, 13)
Eamonn de Barra – whistles (11), flute (11)
Allen Parker – synth loop (8)

Additional Vocalists
The Shadowboxers – backing vocals (3, 4)
Lucy Wainwright Roche – guest vocals (5), additional backing vocals (12)
Damien Dempsey – backing vocals (11)

Production
Peter Collins – producer (1–10, 12–13)
John Reynolds – producer (11)

Chart performance
The album debuted at No. 2 on the Billboard Folk Albums chart, No. 14 on Top Rock Albums, and No. 36 on the Billboard 200, selling 11,000 in its debut week.  The album has sold 42,000 copies in the US as of May 2015.

References

External links
https://web.archive.org/web/20110825084733/http://publicity.vanguardrecords.com/?p=3680

2011 albums
Indigo Girls albums
Albums produced by Peter Collins (record producer)
Vanguard Records albums